Surab District (Balochi: سۏراپ),,  is a district located in central Balochistan province, Pakistan. Prior to its creation as a separate district in  2017, Surab was part of Kalat District.

Administration
The headquarters of Surab district is Surab.

Demographics
At the time of the 2017 census the district had a population of 200,857, of which 102,427 were males and 98,430 females. Rural population was 165,260 (82.28%) while the urban population was 35,597 (17.72%). The literacy rate was 44.46% - the male literacy rate was 53.17% while the female literacy rate was 35.37%. 48 people in the district were from religious minorities. Brahui was the predominant language, spoken by 98.57% of the population.

Surab is largely based on a tribal society and one of the main tribes would be the Muhammad Hassani tribe.

See also
 Surab, Pakistan
 Kalat District
 Balochistan, Pakistan

References

Districts of Pakistan
 Districts of Balochistan, Pakistan